The 2016 National Hurling League was the 85th season of the National Hurling League for inter-county hurling teams since its establishment in 1925. The fixtures were announced on 16 November 2015. The season began on 13 February 2016, and finished on 8 May 2016.

Waterford came into the season as defending champions of the 2015 season. Kerry entered Division 1 as the promoted team from the 2015 season.

Clare won the title for the first time since 1978 after a 1-23 to 2-19 win against Waterford in a replay.

Format

League structure

Thirty four teams compete in the 2016 NHL – six teams in the top five divisions (Divisions 1A, 1B, 2A, 2B & 3A) and four teams in Division 3B. Thirty one county teams from Ireland take part (Cavan do not). Fingal, London and Warwickshire complete the lineup.

Each team plays all the other teams in their division once, either home or away. 2 points are awarded for a win, and 1 for a draw.

Tie-breaker
 If only two teams are level on league points, the team that won the head-to-head match is ranked ahead. If this game was a draw, score difference (total scored minus total conceded in all games) is used to rank the teams.
 If  three or more teams are level on league points, score difference is used to rank them.

Finals, promotions and relegations

Division 1A
 The top four teams qualify for the Division 1 quarter-finals
 The bottom two teams meet in a relegation play-off, with the loser relegated to Division 1B
Division 1B
 The top 2 teams are promoted to Division 1A and qualify for the Division 1 quarter-finals
 Teams ranked 2, 3 & 4 qualify for the Division 1 quarter-finals
 The bottom two teams meet in a play-off, with the loser playing a relegation/promotion match against the Division 2A champions
Division 2A
 The top two teams meet in Division 2A final, with both teams being promoted
 The bottom team is relegated to Division 2B
Division 2B
 The top two teams meet in Division 2B final, with both being promoted
 The bottom two teams meet in a play-off, with the loser playing a relegation/promotion match against the Division 3A champions
Division 3A
 The top two teams meet in Division 3A final, with both being promoted
 The second bottom team play a relegation/promotion match against the Division 3B champions
 The bottom team is relegated to Division 3B
Division 3B
 The top two teams meet in Division 3B final, with both being promoted

Division 1A

Waterford came into the season as defending champions of the 2015 season. Kerry entered Division 1 as the promoted team.

On 8 May 2016, Clare won the title following a 1-23 to 2-19 win over Waterford in a replay of the final. It was their first league title since 1978 and their fourth National League title overall.

Galway, who actually finished above Cork, were relegated from Division 1A after losing the relegation play-off to Cork by 2-22 to 0-25. Clare, who were undefeated in Division 1B, secured promotion to the top tier.

Kilkenny's T. J. Reid was the Division 1 top scorer with 2-61. Clare's Patrick Kelly was the top goalkeeper having kept 4 clean sheets.

Structure

The 12 teams in Division 1 were divided into two groups of six teams named Division 1A and Division 1B. Each team played all the others in its group once. Two points were awarded for a win and 1 for a draw. The first four teams in 1A and 1B advanced to the league quarter-finals with the top team in Division 1A playing the fourth team in Division 1B, the second team in Division 1A playing the third in Division 1B, etc.

Division 1A Table

Division 1A Rounds 1 to 5

Division 1B

Division 1B Table

Division 1B Rounds 1 to 5

Division 1 Knockout

Division 1 Quarter-finals

Division 1 Semi-finals

Division 1 Final & Replay

Division 1A relegation play-off

Division 1B play-off

Division 1B Relegation/Promotion play-off

Statistics

Top scorer overall

Top scorer in a single game

Clean sheets

Division 2A

On 26 March 2016, Westneath won the title after a 0-10 to 0-8 win over Carlow. It was their first league title since 2008 when they claimed the Division 2 title in the old system.

London's Kevin O'Loughlin was the Division 2A top scorer with 3-37.

Table

Rounds 1 to 5

Division 2A Final

Statistics

Top scorer overall

Single game

Division 2B

On 26 March 2016, Armagh won the title after a 0-20 to 1-15 win over Down. It was their first league title since 2006 when they claimed the Division 3 title in the old system. The victory also secured promotion to Division 2A for 2017.

Armagh's Ryan Gaffney was the Division 2B top scorer with 0-53.

Table

Rounds 1 to 5

Division 2B Final

Division 2B play-off

Division 2B Relegation/Promotion play-off

Statistics

Top scorer overall

Single game

Clean sheets

Division 3A

On 26 March 2016, Roscommon won the title after a 4-15 to 0-7 win over Monaghan. It was their first league title since 2011 when they claimed the Division 3B title in the old system. The victory also secured automatic promotion to Division 2B for 2017.

At the other end of the table, Warwickshire were relegated after losing all five of their group stage games. They had secured promotion in 2015 but will return to Division 3B in 2017.

Tyrone's Damian Casey was the Division 3A top scorer with 2-52. Roscommon's Noel Fallon was the top goalkeeper having kept 3 clean sheets.

Table

Rounds 1 to 5

Division 3A Final

Division 3A Relegation/Promotion play-off

Statistics

Top scorer overall

Single game

Clean sheets

Division 3B

On 26 March 2016, Fermanagh won the title after a 2-13 to 3-8 win over Longford. It was their first league title since 2013 when they also claimed the Division 3B title.

Longford's Joe O'Brien was the Division 3B top scorer with 3-22. Longford's Reuben Murray was the top goalkeeper having kept one clean sheet.

Table

Rounds 1 to 3

Division 3B Final

Statistics

Top scorer overall

Single game

Clean sheets

References

External links
Full Fixtures and Results

 
National Hurling League seasons